Thomas White Lamb (May 5th, 1870 – February 26th, 1942) was a Scottish-born, American architect. He was one of the foremost designers of theaters and cinemas in the 20th century.

Career

Born in Dundee, Scotland, United Kingdom, Thomas W. Lamb came to the United States at the age of 12. He studied architecture at Cooper Union in New York and initially worked for the City of New York as an inspector. His architecture firm, Thomas W. Lamb, Inc., was located at 36 West 40th Street in Manhattan, New York.

Lamb achieved recognition as one of the leading architects of the boom in movie theater construction of the 1910s and 1920s. Particularly associated with the Fox Theatres, Loew's Theatres and Keith-Albee chains of vaudeville and film theaters, Lamb was instrumental in establishing and developing the design and construction of the large, lavishly decorated theaters, known as "movie palaces", as showcases for the films of the emerging Hollywood studios.

As early as 1904 Lamb was credited with renovations for two existing theaters in the city:  the Weber and Fields Music Hall at 1215 Broadway, and the Dewey Theater on East 14th Street, the latter owned by Tammany Hall figure "Big Tim" Sullivan.  His first complete theater design was the City Theatre, built on 14th Street in 1909 for film mogul William Fox. His designs for the 1914 Mark Strand Theatre, the 1916 Rialto Theatre and the 1917 Rivoli Theatre, all in Times Square, set the template for what would become the American movie palace.

Among his most notable theaters are the 1929 Fox Theatre in San Francisco and the 1919 Capitol Theatre in New York, both now demolished. Among his most noted designs that have been preserved and restored are the B.F. Keith Memorial Theatre in Boston (1928) (now the Boston Opera House), Warner's Hollywood Theatre (1930) in New York (now the Times Square Church), the Hippodrome Theatre (1914) in Baltimore, and the Loew's Ohio Theatre (1928) in Columbus, Ohio. Among Lamb's existing Canadian theaters are the Pantages Theatre in Toronto (1920) (now the Ed Mirvish Theatre). and Elgin and Winter Garden Theatres. The Cinema Treasures website, which documents the history of film theaters, lists 174 theaters designed by Lamb's company.

Aside from movie theaters, Lamb is noted for designing (with Joseph Urban) New York's Ziegfeld Theatre, a legitimate theater, as well as the third Madison Square Garden and the Paramount Hotel in midtown Manhattan.

Lamb died in 1942 in New York City at the age of 71. His architectural archive is held by the Drawings and Archives Department of Avery Architectural and Fine Arts Library at Columbia University.

John J. McNamara
During the last ten years of his practice, Lamb's associate was the architect John J. McNamara. After Lamb's death, McNamara continued as an architect of theaters under his own name. McNamara was responsible for renovating some of Lamb's older New York theaters, and among his original designs was one for the 1969 Ziegfeld Theatre in Manhattan, which replaced Lamb's original building.

Selected theater designs

United States

 Academy of Music, New York City, 1927 
 B.F. Keith Memorial Theatre, Boston, Massachusetts, 1928
 Capitol Theatre, New York City, 1919
 Capitol Theatre, Port Chester, New York, 1926
 Cort (now James Earl Jones) Theatre, New York City, 1912
 Embassy Theatre, New York City, 1925
 Eltinge 42nd Street Theatre, New York City, 1912
 Fenway Theatre, Boston, 1915
 Fox Theatre, San Francisco, California, 1929
 Franklin Square Theatre, Worcester, Massachusetts, 1927
 Hippodrome Theatre, Baltimore, Maryland, 1914  
 Hippodrome, New York City, 1923 redesign
 Keith-Albee Theatre, Flushing, Queens, New York, 1928
 Keith-Albee Theatre, Huntington, West Virginia, 1928
 Keith-Albee Palace Theatre, Columbus, Ohio, 1926
 Keith-Albee Palace Theatre, Stamford, Connecticut, 1927
 Lincoln Theatre, Miami Beach, Florida, 1936
 Loew's 72nd Street Theatre, New York City, 1930
 Loew's 175th Street Theater, New York City, 1930
 Loew's and United Artists' Ohio Theatre, Columbus, Ohio, 1928
 Loew's Grand Theatre, Atlanta, Georgia, 1932 redesign
 Loew's Midland Theatre, Kansas City, Missouri, 1927
 Midway Theatre, Forest Hills, New York, 1942
 Loew's Pitkin Theatre, Brooklyn, New York, 1928
 Loew's State Theatre, Playhouse Square, Cleveland, Ohio, 1920
 Loew's State Theatre (Now the TCC Roper Performing Arts Center), Norfolk, Virginia, 1926
 Loew's State Theatre, Times Square, New York City, 1924
 Loew's State Theatre, New Orleans, Louisiana, 1926
 Loew's Theatre, New Rochelle, New York, 1925
 Loew's State Theatre (Now the Landmark Theatre), Syracuse, New York, 1928
 Madison Square Garden, New York City, 1925
 Madison Theater, Albany, New York, 1929
 Mark Hellinger Theatre (now Times Square Church), New York City, 1930
 Mark Strand Theater, New York City, 1914
 Maryland Theatre, Hagerstown, Maryland, 1915
 Municipal Auditorium, Birmingham, Alabama, 1924
 Ohio Theatre, Playhouse Square, Cleveland, Ohio, 1921
 Orpheum Theatre, Boston, Massachusetts, 1915 redesign
 Palace Theater, Waterbury, Connecticut, 1922
 Poli's Majestic Theatre, Bridgeport, Connecticut, 1922
 Poli's Palace Theatre, Bridgeport, Connecticut, 1922
 Pythian Temple, Manhattan, 1927, the spacious theater the building once housed is gone; the facade remains.
 Proctor's 58th Street Theatre, New York City, 1928
 Proctor's 86th Street Theatre, New York City, 1927
 Proctor's Theatre, Schenectady, New York, 1926
 Reade's State Theatre, New Brunswick, New Jersey, 1921
 Regent Theatre, New York City, 1913
 Ridgewood Theatre, Ridgewood, New York, 1916
 Rivoli Theatre, New York City, 1917
 Stanley Theatre, Utica, New York, 1928
 State Theatre, Uniontown, Pennsylvania, 1922
 Strand Theatre, Lakewood, New Jersey, 1922
 Tivoli Theatre, Washington, DC, 1924
 Victoria Theater, New York City, 1917
 Warner Theatre, Torrington, Connecticut, 1931
 Warner's Hollywood Theatre, New York City, 1930
 Ziegfeld Theatre, New York City (with Joseph Urban), 1927

Canada

 Elgin and Winter Garden Theatres, Toronto, 1913
 The Sanderson Centre, Brantford, Ontario, 1919; auditorium restored in 1990, currently a performing arts centre
 Capitol Theatre, Hamilton, Ontario, 1920; 103 King Street East, Hamilton all but lobby demolished in 1973; now vacant after Buttinsky's Bar and Wing Joint closed
 Capitol Theatre (Windsor, Ontario), 1920; currently a performing arts centre. 
 Pantages Theatre, Toronto, Ontario, 1920
 Uptown Theatre, Toronto, Ontario, 1920; demolished in 2003

India

 Metro Cinema, Mumbai, Maharashtra, 1938
 Metro Cinema, Kolkata (Calcutta), West Bengal, 1935; Currently being renovated.

Residential architecture

In 1920, Lamb designed for himself a private summer home in the Adirondacks in the village of Elizabethtown, New York. The house,  which is still extant as a residence, is situated on the Boquet River. The eight-bedroom manor, referred to today as Cobble Mountain Lodge, is a shingle and cobble stone design marked by the inclusion of a stone turret.

References

External links
Cinema Treasures' List of theatres designed by Thomas W. Lamb.
Thomas W. Lamb works in the collection of the Cooper-Hewitt, National Design Museum
 Gray, Christopher, Streetscapes: Thomas W. Lamb’s Theaters, An Architect for Stage and Screen, Wired New York, October 5, 2008
Thomas W. Lamb Architecture on Google Maps
Thomas W. Lamb and John J. McNamara architectural records, 1895-1989, held by the Avery Architectural and Fine Arts Library, Columbia University
Lamb, Thomas W. fonds (R12543) at Library and Archives Canada

1871 births
1942 deaths
American theatre architects
Architecture firms based in New York City
Architects from New York City
People from Dundee